The tram system in the city of Kolkata, West Bengal, India, operated by West Bengal Transport Corporation (WBTC) after Calcutta Tramways Company (CTC) was dissolved, is the oldest existing tram network operating in India, and oldest operating tramway in Asia. Started in 1902, it is the second oldest electric tramway in India (the Madras electric street tramway being the first).

The network initially had up to 37 lines in the 1960s, but has gradually reduced over the years with only six lines currently operating due to financial struggles, poor maintenance, low ridership, addition of road flyovers, expansion of the Kolkata Metro, slow tram speed and perceptions that the trams are outdated and occupy too much road space. As per WBTC which maintains the existing tram lines, two routes (24/29 and 25) had been running regularly, with very irregular and limited service on the other five routes (36, 5, 18, 11, 15/12). As of January 2023, only the two regular routes are in service with the service on other routes shut down.

Due to these issues, there have been occasional talks of either shutting down the network permanently or lowering operations of the system. However, the system is also considered environmentally friendly and an icon of Kolkata, so there have also been recent efforts to sustain the system with newer trams.

History

1873–1901: Horse-drawn trams

The service was discontinued on 20 November of that year. The Calcutta Tramway Company was formed and registered in London on 22 December 1880. Meter-gauge horse-drawn tram tracks were laid from Sealdah to Armenian Ghat via Bowbazar Street, Dalhousie Square, and Strand Road. The route was inaugurated by the Viceroy, Lord Ripon, on 1 November 1880.

At first, it was planned to open tram network in three directions – in north towards Kumartuli via Chitpur Road (now Rabindra Sarani) for easy transportation of then-rich Indians, middle-classes and poor who lived in those areas, in the east towards Sealdah stations via Bowbazar Street (now Bipin Bihari Gangopadhay Street) for railway passengers’ interchange who come from outside of Kolkata, and in the south towards Kalighat via Russa Road (now Ashutosh Mukhopadhyay Road) because not only for easy transportation of then-rich Indians, middle-classes and poor who lived at those areas but also as a Hindu pilgrimage regarding Kali temple for inhabitants and tourists. Kalighat tram depot was also constructed at that, time, which was also a minor workshop for all horse trams. Besides this the city center connection between Dharmatala (now known as Esplanade) & Dalhousie Square (now known as Binay Badal Dinesh Bag) was also established via Old Court House Street (now Hemanta Basu Sarani). One year later, a second route towards north Kolkata up to Shyambazar via College Street was opened for residents and students of medical college, university, and various schools & colleges. A second route from Wellington Square (now known as Subodh Chandra Mullick Square) to Sealdah Station via Moula Ali was also opened for more transportation of railway passengers. Sealdah tram terminus was at that place where now the Kolkata metro line 2 station is under construction. At the same time, the first opening a westward tram route was opened by the High Court via Strand Road (now Rajib Gandhi Sarani) was connected by tram network for pleaders, law-related peoples, and river-bathers of Ganga. High Court tram terminus was at that place where now the annexure building of the High Court is situated.  Another connection from Metcalf Hall towards Nimtala via Strand Road (now Rajib Gandhi Sarani) was also opened for serving the crematorium and serving of businessmen. Nimtala tram terminus was at that place beside of the red temple building is now situated.  By opening those routes, Shyambazar, High Court, Nimtala, Sealdah, Dalhousie Square, Dharmatala and Kalighat area was connected by horse tram. Kalighat was the only depot at that time, so it is the oldest tram depot.

Timeline
1873 – Opening of horse tram as meter gauge, closure in the same year.
1880 – Final opening of horse tram as a permanent system. Calcutta Tramways Company was established.
1881 – Dalhousie Square – Lalbazar - Bowbazar – Lebutala - Sealdah Station route opened (Later route 14). Esplanade – Lalbazar – Pagyapatti – Companybagan - Shobhabazar – Kumortuli route opened (Later route 7 after extension). Dalhousie Square – Esplanade connection opened (Later route 22, 24, 25 & 29). The connection was improved at Lalbazar Junction for through running trams from Dalhousie Square to Kumortuli (Later route 8 after extension). Esplanade – Planetarium - Hazra Park – Kalighat route opened. (Later route 30). Occasional through service started from Kumortuli to Kalighat either via Esplanade or via Dalhousie Square.
1882 - Esplanade – Wellington Square – Bowbazar – Boipara - Hatibagan - Shyambazar Junction route opened (Later route 5). The connection was improved at Bowbazar Junction for through running trams from Dalhousie Square to Shyambazar (Later route 6).  Wellington Square – Moula Ali - Sealdah Station route opened (Later route 12 after extension). Dalhousie Square – Metcalfe Hall - High Court route opened (Later route 14 extension). Direct tram service from Sealdah Station to High Court started. Metcalfe Hall – Howrah Bridge – Nimtala route opened (Later route 19). Direct tram service from Esplanade to Nimtala started. At this time steam tram service was thought.

1883–1902: Steam trams

In 1882, steam locomotives were deployed experimentally to haul tram cars. In the next year a new route opened for steam tram service towards Khidirpur. Tram tracks were laid down via Dufferin Road through maidan, and on reserved track for high-speed steam trams for morning walkers, tourists, race-course goers, and peoples living on those area. Khidirpur tram depot was also constructed at that time, which was also a minor workshop for all steam trams.  It was followed by a south-central branch towards from Wellington Square to Park Street (now Mother Teresa Sarani) via Wellesley Street (now Rafi Ahmed Kidwai Road). After a long sixteen years gap, the Nimtala route was connected with Company Bagan line via Nimtala Ghat Street, and the Dharmatala – Nimtala service was changed to steam tram. At this time horse trams ran on Shyambazar, Sealdah, High Court & Kalighat routes, and steam trams ran on Nimtala, Park Street & Khidirpur route. The Dharmatala – Wellington Square section and Esplanade – Metcalfe Hall section, were served by both horse and steam trams until 1901. Khidirpur & Kalighat were the only steam & horse tram depot at that time respectively.

By the end of the century, the company owned 166 tram cars, 1,000 horses, seven steam locomotives, and 19 miles of track.

Timeline
1883 - Esplanade – Racecourse - Wattganj – Khidirpur route opened (Later route 36)
1884 - Wellington Square – Park Street route opened (Later route 21 & 22 after extension)
1900 - Nimtala – Companybagan route opened (non-revenue service only). Electrification & conversion to standard gauge was started.

1902–1951: Electric trams

The first electric tramcar in Calcutta ran from Esplanade to Kidderpore on 27 March 1902, with service from Esplanade to Kalighat introduced on 14 June of that year. Both Kalighat & Khidirpur tram depot was converted to electric tram depot. The connecting route through Grey Street (now Arabinda Sarani) was opened in that year for a second route between Shyambazar and Dharmatala. The Nonapukur tram workshop was established also in that year, from where the track connection up to Wellesley Street opened via Elliott Road, after which the Park Street branch closed. Now the major repairing of the horse, steam and electric trams was started at Nonapukur. In next year, the Kalighat line was extended to Tollygunge for serving the then south suburban area and film studios via Russa Road (now Shyama Prasad Mukhopadhyay Road). Tollygunge tram depot was also construed at that time, which was the largest tram depot in terms of area. The Shyambazar line was also extended to Belgachia for serving the then north suburban area, hospital, and rail yards via Belgachhia Road (now Radha Gobinda Kar Road). Belgachhia tram depot and Shyambazar tram terminus were also opened in this year. In next year, The Kumourtuli line was extended to Bagbazar, after which the Kumortuli terminus was closed. Bagbazar tram terminus was at that place where now a lorry parking area beside the circular railway track. A new route from Sealdah Station to Howrah Bridge (now Rabindra Setu) via Harrison Road (now Mahatma Gandhi Road) was opened on next year, for serving the businessmen, residents, ferry passengers and railway passengers for Howrah Station. At that time the electrification project was completed.

Two years later, the connection between Nonapukur and Moula Ali opened via Circular Road (now Acharya Jagadish Chandra Basu Road), and after that tram service started from Nonapukur to Howrah Bridge via Sealdah station. A branch up to Mominpur was also opened from Wattganj via Diamond Harbour Road, but at that time direct access was constructed through Orphanganjbazar. In next year a new branch was constructed from Shyambazar Junction to Galiff Street via Cornwallis Street (now Bidhan Sarani), and occasional tram service was also started from Galiff Street to Dharmatala. Side by side the Mominpur branch was also extended up to Behala, another then south suburban area via Diamond Harbour Road (now Balananda Brahmachari Sarani). At that time Behala tram terminus was at right side of Diamond Harbour Road. The connecting route through Alipur Road was also opened in that year for a tram connection between Behala & Kalighat, also a second route between Kalighat and Dharmatala.

At that time, tram service was opened in Howrah City. From Howrah Station, two routes were selected. One towards north up to Bandhaghat via Dobson Road (Now Moulana Abul Kalam Azad Road), another towards south up to Shibpur via Grand Trunk Road. For shibpur route, a single coach double-ended tram was selected due to the lack of creating a loop at Shibpur. For Howrah service, a new depot was constructed at Ghasbagan. Hence then the old Howrah Bridge was a pontoon bridge, it was not possible to connect Kolkata tram and Howrah tram directly.

Two years later, the Sealdah Station to Rajabazar route opened in 1910. Rajabazar tram depot was also constructed at that time, which was the largest tram depot in terms of track number.

After a long 15 years gap, new tram route construction had started again in 1925. The Nonapukur line was extended to Park Circus via Park Street (now Mother Teresa Sarani) for serving residents and circus goers of that area. Park Circus tram depot was also constructed at that time. In the next year, the direct access of the Behala line via Orphanganjbazar was replaced by present alignment via Wattganj junction for smooth tram service. A new terminus near Racecourse was constructed in next year for race special trams towards Belgachhia, Bagbazar, Galiff Street, Rajabazar, High Court, Nimtala, Park Circus, Tollygunge, Behala & Khidirpur. In the next year, a new branch was constructed from Kalighat to Ballygunge, another then south suburb of Kolkata via Ballygunge Avenue (now Rasbihari Avenue).

 

After again a long 13 years gap, new tram route construction had started again in 1941. The Rajabazar line was extended to connect with Galiff Street line at Shyambazar junction via Circular Road (now Acharya Praphulla Chandra Ray Road). Two years later, when new Howrah Bridge (now Rabindra Setu) was opened, tram service started crossing the river Hooghly and connecting Kolkata & Howrah tram network. Very few times trams from Shibpur and Bandhaghat came towards Dharmatala and Rajabazar. In the same year, the Park Circus line was extended to connect with the Ballygunge line at Gariahat junction via Gariahat Road (now Syed Amir Ali Avenue). Gariahat tram depot was also constructed at that time. With this extension, total track length reached .

1951–1990: Nationalisation
In 1951, the government of West Bengal entered an agreement with the Calcutta Tramways Company, and the Calcutta Tramways Act of 1951 was enacted. The government assumed the tramways, reserving the right to purchase the system with two years' notice on 1 January 1972 or at any time thereafter. After Independence, during the partition of India, the number of people started dramatically increasing on the roads of Kolkata due to a lot of refugees. The city centre area started getting congested due to the increasing number of buses and cars. So tram company thought to shift the tram tracks of Dalhousie Square from outside to the inside of the square. It was completed in 1952. It was followed by redesigning of Esplanade terminus in 1960, also due to increasing number of pedestrians and automobiles. At that time, there were five ways of tram routes from Esplanade, i.e. – Bentinck Street, Dharmatala Street (now Lenin Sarani), Chowrangi Road (now Jawaharlal Nehru Road), Dufferin Road and Old Court House Street (now Hemanta Basu Sarani), and three ways of tram routes from Dalhousie Square, i.e. – Old Court House Street (now Hemanta Basu Sarani), Hare Street & Lalbazar Street. Four years later, the old Majherhat bridge was replaced by a new bridge with tram tracks. In 1967, the Government of West Bengal passed the Calcutta Tramways Company (Taking Over of Management) Act and assumed management on 19 July. Until this time, there was the platinum age of Kolkata, with maximum number of rolling stocks, route kilometers and passengers.

Decline

The decline of tram networks was started in India in the early thirties, where the Kanpur tram was closed. However other cities had continued tram, but mass closure started from mid- fifties to mid-sixties, where tram networks of Chennai, Delhi, and Mumbai gradually closed. Overall the world, at that time, trams thought an old technology and inflexible. The number of automobiles was increasing, so it was started occupying tram tracks especially on narrow streets, and tram services got hampered. But surprisingly, car and bus drivers started blaming the tram, which was fueled by political leaders. So it was decided to close the entire Kolkata tram network within 1980. On 8 November 1976, the Calcutta Tramways (Acquisition of Undertaking) ordinance was promulgated under which the company (and its assets) was nationalized.

The Howrah sections were decided to close first, because the government thought trams were creating traffic jams on narrow streets of Howrah city. So in 1971, both the Bandhaghat and Shibpur lines were closed, including the Ghasbagan tram depot. The depot got vacant and abandoned for some vehicle dumping place. However the Howrah station terminus survived, but it was started redesigning largely. All single and double coach trams were transferred to Kolkata area. In Kolkata, a new tram terminus was constructed in Behala, this time on the left side of Diamond Harbour Road for no need for reversing the tram. Two years later, Nimtala route along Companybagan (now Rabindra Kanan) section was closed in May 1973, and the Howrah Station terminus redesigning completed in 1976. The racecourse terminus was also closed due to the construction of 2nd Hooghly Bridge (now Vidyasagar Setu).

However, tram service was survived in Kolkata, largely supported by then transport minister Rabin Mukherjee, and also due to high rise of oil prices in the international market, which make costly for automobiles. Internationally some cities were started returning tram for this economical reason. Since 1978, line 1 of  Kolkata metro construction was started by the cut & cover method. It was needed the construction of a large trench through the planned route, which was mostly served before by tram. So it was thought to temporarily close the tram service along those routes. Later it was planned to part of the tram routes in south Kolkata would remain opened because two tram depots  - Kalighat & Tollygunge are situated along the tram route, and it was not practical to close those depots and close a number of tram routes for this reason, rather thought to diverse some tram routes. For this reason, tram tracks between Hazra Park (then renamed to Jatin Das Park) and Dharmatala (then renamed to Esplanade) via Planetarium was closed (the 3rd oldest tram route), but all tram routes which were running via Ashutosh Mukhopadhyay Road and Jawaharlal Nehru Road were diverted via Biplabi Ganesh Ghosh Sarani, Alipur Road, Diamond Harbour Road, Khidirpur Road & Dufferin Road. This closed section was partially reopened in the next year between Planetarium and Esplanade due to protests of passengers, tourists, and hawkers. A new terminus was constructed beside Birla Planetarium. At that time, construction of Sealdah Flyover was started. Due to its low height (for running tram on it), it was decided to close tracks between Sealdah and Lebutala, but diverse this route from Lebutala to Mirzapur via Raja Ram Mohan Sarani & Surya Sen Street. In the 1st phase, tram service opened between Mirzapur and Purabi cinema for Howrah Station tram routes, and in the next year from Purabi Cinema to Lebutala for Binay Badal Dinesh Bag routes. At that time Surya Sen Street was the only tram only street of Kolkata, and the original route previously mentioned (the oldest tram route) with Sealdah Station terminus was closed. For metro line 1 construction, the tracks between Lalbazar and Esplanade via Bentinck Street (the 2nd oldest tram route) was also closed, but all tram routes which were running via Bentinck Street were diverted via Hemanta Basu Sarani & Lalbazar Street. In next year, Sealdah flyover opened with tram tracks on it. It was very few flyovers of the world which had tram tracks.

Expansion
After a one decade major closures of the lines, some new routes were planned by government. Then transport minister Rabin Mukherjee proposed some new lines and connecting lines. Those were – 
1)	Maniktala to Bidhannagar 
2)	Behala to Joka
3)	Galiff Street to Dakshineshwar
4)	Tollygunge out post to Jadabpur.
5)	Ultadanga to Airport
6)	Kalighat to Taratala (via New Alipur)
7)	Moula Ali to Park Circus (via Sundari Mohan Avenue)
For first phase, first two lines were selected. On 17 April 1985, tracks were extended  from Maniktala to Ultadanga via Maniktala Main Road (now Satin Sen Sarani) and C. I. T. Road. (now Acharya Satyendra Nath Basu Sarani).  This route was selected for expanding the Kolkata towards east. At first it was planned that there will be two branches, one to Bidhannagar (Karunamayi), another to Airport. However, residents of Bidhanngar were highly against of tram, so that extension was finally cancelled. The Airport extension was also cancelled later. On 31 December 1986, the route extension from Behala to Joka was completed via Diamond Harbour Road. It was the first and only village extension of Kolkata tram network, for developing this area as a city. After opening this line, it was the longest tram route of Kolkata.

Unfortunately, this opening created some controversy. The then transport minister Rabin Mukherjee was an MLA of Behala (West), where this route passed. When it was opened, it broke the election code of conduct, and so he was suspended from the post of transport minister before the election. He was a strong supporter of tram, and after his suspension, when new transport minister Shyamal Chakraborty joined, fast declining of Kolkata tram was started again after some years. All the remaining plans were also cancelled forever at that time.

Timeline
1902 - Khidirpur & Kalighat routes were electrified. Shobhabazar – Hatibagan connecting route opened. (Later route 9 & 10), alternative service was started from Shambazar to Dharmatala and Dalhousie Square via this route. Nonapukur Workshop opened with Royd Street – Nonapukur route opening (Later route 21 & 22 after re-extension). Direct tram service from Nonapukur to Dalhousie Square started. Royd Street – Park Street closed.
1903 – Shyambazar terminus opened with Shyambazar – Belgachhia route opened. (Later route 1, 2, 3, 4 & 11). Direct tram service from Belgachhia to Dharmatala & Dalhousie Square started. Kalighat – Tollyganj route opened (Later route 29 & 32).  Direct tram service from Tollyganj to Dalhousie Square started.
1904 - Kumortuli – Bagbazar route opened. Kumortuli terminus closed. (Later route 7 & 8) Direct tram service was started from Bagbazar to Dharmatala and Dalhousie Square.
1905 - Howrah Bridge – Pagyapatti – Boipara – Purabi Cinema - Sealdah Station route opened (Later route 15). The connection was improved at Pageyapatti Junction and Boipara Junction for through running trams from Howrah Bridge to Dharmatala (Later route 21) and Howrah Bridge to Shyambazar (Later route 11). Semi Circular service from High Court to Esplanade via Sealdah started. All remaining then-opened routes were electrified.
1907 - Moula Ali – Nonapukur route opened (Later route 20 & 26 after extension). Direct tram service started from Nonapukur to Howrah Bridge.  Wattganj – Mominpur route opened (via direct access through Orphanganjbazar). (Later route 31)
1908 - Shyambazar Junction – Galiff Street route opened (Later route 12). Howrah Station – Ghasbagan - Bandhaghat. (Later route 41 & 42) and Howrah Station – Shibpur route opened (Later route 40). Hazra Park – Mominpur – Behala old terminus route opened (via Majherhat old bridge). (Later route 27 & 35). Direct tram service started from Behala to Dharmatala and Behala to Kalighat. The connection was improved at Mominpur Junction for alternative service was started from Kalighat to Dharmatala and Dalhousie Square via this route. (Later route 31)
1910 - Sealdah Station – Mirzapur – Rajabazar route opened. (Later route 12) Direct tram service started from Rajabazar to Dharmatala. The connection was improved at Sealdah Junction for through running trams from Rajabazar to High Court. (Later route 14)
1925 - Nonapukur – Parkcircus route opened. (Later route 20, 21 & 22)
1926 - Orphanganjbazar direct access was replaced by present alignment via Wattganj Junction.
1927 - Racecourse terminus built for race special tram service.
1928 - Kalighat Junction – Ballyganj route opened.. (Later route 24 & 27 extension). Direct tram service started from Ballyganj to Tollyganj, Behala, and Dalhousie Square. 
1941 - Rajabazar – Shyambazar Junction route opened. (Later route 12 & 13). Direct tram service started from Galiff Street to Dharmatala & Dalhousie Square via Sealdah and/or Moula Ali, also some occasional tram service started from Belgachia to Rajabazar, Belgachia to Bagbazar route.
1943 - Howrah Bridge – Howrah Station (via Howrah Bridge) route opened.. Route 11, 20, 21, 22, 30 & 32 were extended to Howrah Station. All tram routes which were running up to Howrah Bridge now started going directly up to Howrah station from Belgachhia, Galiff Street, Rajabazar, Park Circus, Tollygunge, and Kalighat. Occasional tram service also started from Howrah Station to Nimtala & High Court. Gariahat depot opened with Parkcircus – Gariahat Junction route opened (Later route 25 & 26). Direct tram service started from Ballygunge to Dharmatala & Howrah Station via Park Circus. This was the last tram extension in Kolkata before Indian Independence.
1952 - Dalhousie Square terminus redesigned, outside park tracks brought into the park.
1960 - Esplanade terminus redesigned.
1964 - Majherhat new bridge built.
1971 - Behala new terminus built. Howrah Station – Ghasbagan – Bandhaghat closed, Ghasbagan depot became a goods vehicle stock depot. (Route 41, 42). Howrah Station – Shibpur closed. (Route 40)
1973 - Howrah Bridge – Nimtala - Companybagan section closed. (Route 19)
1976 - Howrah Station terminus redesigned after the closure of Bandhaghat & Shibpur route, converted to the private bus terminus and opening of the pedestrian subway. Racecourse terminus closed.
1978 - Esplanade – Planetarium - Hazra Park closed for conversion to metro line 1. All tram services from Tollyganj, Kalighat & some services from Ballyganj were started running via Mominpur & Wattganj.
1979 - Esplanade – Planetarium reopened. (Route 12A)
1980 - Purabi Cinema – Mirzapur route opened. (Route 13 diversion)
1981 - Lebutala – Purabi Cinema route opened. (Route 14 diversion).  Esplanade – Lalbazar closed. (Route 3, 7 & 9). Lebutala - Sealdah Station terminus closed for flyover, but trams continued serving Sealdah Station. (Route 13 & 14 diversion) Some tram services from Galiff Street, Rajabazar, High Court, Park Circus & Ballyganj were started running via Purabi Cinema.
1982 - Sealdah flyover opened, with tram tracks on it.
1985 - Maniktala – Ultadanga old terminus route opened. (Route 16 & 17)
1986 - Behala – Joka route opened. (Route 37)  Connection was improved at Maniktala Junction for through running trams from Belgachhia to Ultadanga.

1990–present: Later developments and mass closures

Since 1990, losses of Kolkata tram started increasing, and to overcome this, it was thought by government that the entire tram network will be gradually replaced by bus, and lands of depot and terminus will be sold to promoters for construction of high-rise buildings. Calcutta Tramways Company introduced the bus service on 4 November 1992 with a fleet of 40 buses. The Planetarium line was closed due to excuse of loss making. The terminus was converted to park, however tracks were still present until 2010, and masts are still present, now are being used by lamp posts. After two years, The Howrah Station terminus closed, converted to bus terminus and the tram tracks were removed on Rabindra Setu the following year, since the world's busiest ageing cantilever bridge was not strong enough for trams. The routes which terminated there were moved back to the Burrabazar (Howrah Bridge) terminus (formerly Burrabazar Junction). Tram tracks from Howrah Bridge terminus to Metcalf Hall was also closed due to excuse of road repair, and all routes which were served this section was now diverted via Rabindra Sarani. However, in this year a new terminus in Ultadanga opened near Railway Station.

The system had degraded by the 1990s, and Minister for Transport Shyamal Chakraborty planned to close the network. In 1995, the High Court terminus closed for the reconstruction of Strand Road. Rails and wires were removed from there and from Strand Road, Hare Street, and Shahid Khudiram Basu Road and it is now the site of the newest Kolkata High Court centenary building. However, Melbourne tram conductor Roberto D'Andrea befriended fellow Calcutta conductors during a 1994 visit. When D'Andrea heard about the planned network closure, he suggested an art project to decorate the trams (as was done in his home city). The project increased public awareness of the network and its value, ultimately saving it at that time.

However closures were continued. In 1998, the Gariahat Depot–Gariahat Junction link on Lila Roy Sarani closed for construction of the Gariahat overpass. It was early planned to relaying tram tracks on two sides of the road under the overpass, but it was finally cancelled because of then Mayor Subrata Mukherjee. During his reign, tram network again got on threat of closure, because he is a strong anti-tram person. Four years later, the Mominpur–Behala route on Diamond Harbour Road closed for the construction of an overpass in Taratala. Although it was initially planned to relaying tracks on the overpass after its completion, the road was later converted to a national highway and the plan was dismissed.

Mass Concretization

In 2004, state government decided to deserved all grass-bed reserved tracks from tram only operation, and replace it by concrete bed. Cobblestone bed tracks were also planned to replacing by concrete bed. For this reason, Shayambazar to Galiff Street section was closed, and modification of Shyambazar junction done by now tram service could continue from Rajabazar to Belgachia instead of Galiff Street. Rails and overhead lines were removed from part of the Bidhan Sarani route. In 2008, Binay Badal Dinesh Bag terminus was largely redesigned for construction of underground car parking.

Since 2011, line 3 of Kolkata metro construction was started by elevated method. It was needed construction of pillars through the planned route from Majherhat to Joka, which was mostly served before by tram. So the Behala-Joka route closed for construction of the metro line 3. In next year, Bagbazar terminus was closed, due to a legal dispute, and the non-revenue section between Bagbazar and Galiff Street became regular route, and double tracked. Galiff Street Terminus was realigned, irregular service from Bagbazar to Galiff Street became regular service. The Lalbazar-Mirzapur down line was closed, but the up line remained. In 2013, 'Charoibeti' and 'Rupasi Bangla', two AC trams, were manufactured at the Nonapukur workshop for heritage tours only. A regular AC tram route would not start until 6 years later. On 30 September 2014, a tram, converted into a museum (Smaranika) in Esplanade, was opened to the public. The Park Circus Depot closed for construction of the Maa Flyover in 2015 and the Nonapukur Depot/Workshop has started regular service; the Gariahat Depot remained. The following year, the Ballygunge Station Depot next to Gariahat Mall also reopened and thus Kalighat/Rashbehari-Ballygunge Station stretch (via Gariahat) became active after 12 years.

After the starting of the line 2 of Kolkata metro  in 2017, all the Binay Badal Dinesh Bag bound tram routes have been closed for an indefinite time. Thus tram-plying along Sealdah (Purabi Cinema) Junction-Bowbazar Junction-Lalbazar Junction-BBD Bag, Galiff Street-Sovabazar Junction-Chitpur Junction-Lalbazar Junction, and Hatibagan Junction-Sovabazar Junction stretches has been stopped. The Wattgunge junction to Kalighat/Rashbehari Junction stretch has also been closed for an indefinite time since 2018, due to the Majherhat Bridge collapse and thus Tollygunge to Ballygunge Station bound tram route becomes an isolated one. In 2019, it was decided by All India Trinamool Congress government that no any tram service would be continued over any bridge, because tram could reduce the lifespan of bridges. After the decision of mayor Firhad Hakim and transport minister Shubhendu Adhikari, tram service was closed on Belgachia Bridge, Shyambazar Bridge, Maniktala Bridge, Kalighat Bridge & Sealdah Overpass. The tram trackbed renewal program became unfinished on Belgachia Bridge and Sealdah Overpass, and starting of tram track uprooting started on those bridges. Belgachia tram depot also has been converted to bus depot, despite the track renewal program inside the depot was just completed two months earlier, and thus tram-plying along Maniktala Junction-Shyambazar Junction-Belgachia and Shyambazar Tram Terminus-Shyambazar Junction stretches is closed since 2018. In 2019, first A.C. tram route (AC-1) of Kolkata starts which runs between Esplanade and Shyambazar. The state government decided to stop tram-plying on the 37 years old Sealdah Flyover (Vidyapati Setu), after the survey of the bridge-advisory committee officers in 2019 and thus tram-plying along the Mirzapur-Nonapukur, Purabi Cinema-Sealdah and Moulali-Subodh Chandra Mallik Square stretches has also been stopped. State Government also decided to shut down tram-plying on Belgachia Bridge permanently due to the excessive load on the bridge.

Timeline
1992 - Esplanade – Planetarium route reclosed. (Route 12A). Bus service introduced.
1994 - Howrah Station terminus closed and converted to public bus terminus. Route 11, 20 & 26 had come back to Howrah Bridge terminus. Metcalfe Hall – Howrah Bridge terminus closed. (Route 15, 21, 30 & 32 diversion). Ultadanga new terminus opened.
1995 - Dalhousie Square – Metcalfe Hall - High Court route closed. Route 14 had come back to Dalhousie Square terminus.
1998 - Gariahat Depot – Gariahat Junction route closed. (Route 25 & 26 had come back to Gariahat Depot)
2002 - Mominpur – Behala route closed. (Route 27, 35 & 37)
2004 - Shyambazar Junction – Galiff Street route closed. (Route 13, route 12 had come back to Rajabazar)
2008 - Dalhousie Square terminus redesigned for underground car parking.
2011 - Behala – Joka route closed for conversion to metro line 3.
2012 - Bagbazar terminus closed, Bagbazar – Galiff Street section doubled. (Route 8 had extended to Galiff Street)
2019 - Maniktala - Shyambazar – Belgachhia route closed. Belgachhia depot became a full bus depot. (Route 1, 2, & 4. Route 11 had started from Shyambazar terminus). Mirzapur – Sealdah – Moula Ali – Nonapukur route closed. (Route 12, 17, 20, 26) Wellington Square – Moula Ali route closed. (Route 12, 17)
2020 - Kalighat – Wattganj closed (Route 24, 29, 30). Rajabazar – Maniktala – Ultadanga closed. (Route 16, 17, 18). Khidirpur – Esplanade closed. (Route 36).

Rolling stock 
CTC owns 257 trams, of which 125 used to run daily. Each single-deck articulated car can carry 200 passengers (60 seated). But the number of trams is decreasing sharply due to various reasons and now only 35 trams run daily.

The early horse-drawn cars and steel cars manufactured before 1952 were imported from England. Early trams were single-coach, similar to those in Delhi, Mumbai, Chennai and Kanpur. Triple-coach trams were tried without success. The later stock was the SLT type: double-coach with three doors, four wheels under each coach and no wheels between coaches. SLT trams had no front iron net but had a front-coach trolley pole. The both-end type had a front iron net and a rear-coach trolley pole. These were gradually replaced by articulated trams on all routes. The SLC type was introduced much later on the Bandhaghat line, and continued until its closure in 1971; after that, SLC trams began running on the Gariahat and Tollygunge lines on the Kolkata side.

Two trams were recently renovated with front and back glass, fluorescent lights, FM radio, digital display boards, angled seats, and a fibreglass ceiling. The Nonapukur workshop began manufacturing 19 new trams from 2008 to 2010, of which four are nearing completion. The roof is clear polycarbonate sheeting with a wide window, and it has comfortable seating and better visibility from within. The workshop is also renovating steel-body (BSCL) cars. With plans for banquet-cafeteria and air-conditioned trams to attract commuters and foreign tourists (increasing CTC revenue), a single-coach, air-conditioned banquet tram has been introduced for heritage tours of North Kolkata in the morning and South Kolkata in the evening. Although the air-conditioned tram had poor ridership when it was introduced, more air-conditioned trams have since been introduced. These include a tram restaurant (Victoria) and the world's first shopping (glam) tram and library tram.

Types of rolling stock 

J Class Trams - The J Class tramse were 4 Axled Single Car Trams numbered from 301 to 306
 K ClassTrams - The K Class trams (often called the English Cars) were articulated 6 axled wooden trams manufactured between 1931 and 1939. These trams were numbered between 307 and 489.
 L Class Trams - The L Class trams (often affectionately called the Hatigari or Elephant Car) were Streamlined articulated trams manufactured between 1942 and 1951 at the Nonapukur Workshop. These trams were numbered between 490 and 559. The L class trams were one of the most iconic types of trams to have ever ran on Kolkata's streets, it had extra overhand both at its front and rear.
 PAYE Trams- Pay As You Enter or PAYE Trams - after the closure of the Bombay (now Mumbai) tramways in 1964, CTC obtained 45 sets of maximum-traction trucks ans controllers from Bombay Electricity Supply and Transport Undertaking (BEST). These running units were used in a class of six experimental Pay As You Enter (PAYE) trams. The prototype (201) was built in 1965, and 202-203 followed in 1966, with 204 - 206 being added in 1967. In about 1970 the PAYE system was dropped and the trams were modified to conventional layout with roving rather than seated conductors, and the entrances at the ends of the trams were sealed.
 Sundari Trams - Sundari trams were wooden articulated trams similar to the K Class built in 1976 - 77. These trams were rumbered between 561 and 587. The chief difference was that these trams were fitted out as double first class cars. This feature also won the trams their alternative title of "De Luxe" trams. The double headlamps gave way to a single unit but, on the other hand, the blue and white livery was adorned with black and white flashes on the dash, and black and white chevrons on the fenders and trolley poles, and a glass whinscreen.

 Burn & Jessop cars – After many years of SLC and articulated trams, rolling stock arrived from Burn Standard India which is stronger, heavier and faster than earlier designs and reversed the declining public perception of trams in the city. The improved stock began running throughout the city on all routes. The Burnstandard Trams were delivered between 1982 and 1989, and were numbered between: A- 207 to 281, B- 291 to 299, C- 600 to 659 and D- 701 to 725. The Jessop trams are sleeker than the Burnstandard in design and were delivered between 1988 and 1989 and were numbered betwewn 681 to 700. Some were modified with front glass; some are modified to resemble Melbourne's B-class trams with fluorescent lights, back glass and double ends.

 Single-coach – Introduced on 24 December 2012, they are reportedly faster and more manoeuvrable than double-coach trams; the carriage is longer than those in double-coach trams. More single-coach trams are planned across the city (including air-conditioned coaches), possibly replacing double-coach trams and enabling some closed routes to reopen.
 Fibre Body Trams – Before the introduction of the single-coach tram in December 2012, this was the last new rolling stock. Refurbiished in the Nonapukur Workshop, various L Class, Burnstandard and Jessop trams were completely torn down and refurbised from scratch. Some were modified with front glass; one was modified with fluorescent lights, FM radio, digital advertising and route boards. These refurbished cars were built between 2008 and 2011Single-coach – Introduced on 24 December 2012, they are reportedly faster and more manoeuvrable than double-coach trams; the carriage is longer than those in double-coach trams. More single-coach trams are planned across the city (including air-conditioned coaches), possibly replacing double-coach trams and enabling some closed routes to reopen.

Power supply
The trams have a 550 V DC power supply from overhead lines. Power is obtained from a trolley pole, a current collector mounted on top of the tram. The track rails are the return path for the current. DC power is supplied by mercury-arc rectifier (converter) stations, located throughout the city.

Depots and Termini
A tram depot featured as workshop is located at Nonapukur, where trams are refurbished and modernised.

Depots
 Kalighat – 1881 to still running, tram depot. (Route 30, 31)
 Khidirpur – 1883 to still running, tram and bus depot. (Route 36)
 Belgachhia – 1903 to 2019 = 116 years, now bus depot. (Route 1, 2, 3, 4, 11)
 Tollygunge – 1903 to still running, now tram & bus depot. (Route 28, 29, 32, 50)
 Ghasbagan – 1908 to 1971 = 63 years, now bus depot. (Route 41, 42)
 Rajabazar – 1910 to still running, now tram & bus depot. (Route 14)
 Park Circus – 1925 to 2016, now a bus depot. (Route 20, 21, 22)
 Gariahat – 1943 to still running, now tram & bus depot. (No specific route originally, later 25 & 26)

Termini
 Dalhousie Square – 1881, temporarily suspended as tram terminus (?) for construction of metro line 2. (Route 2,4,6,8,13,14,16,22,24,25,29,30)
 Sealdah Station – 1881 to 1981 = 100 years, now metro station entrance. (Route 14)
 Esplanade – 1881 to still running, now tram & bus terminus. (Route 1,3,5,7,9,12,15,17,19,22,24,25,29,31,35,36,37)
 High Court – 1882 to 1995 = 91 years, now annex building of high court. (Route 14,15)
 Nimtala – 1882 to 1973 = 63 years, now a street. (Route 19)
 Shyambazar - 1903 to still running, tram terminus. (Route 5,6,9,10)
 Bagbazar – 1904 to 2012 = 108 years, now a godown. (Route 7,8)
 Galiff Street – 1908, temporarily suspended as terminus (?) for construction of metro line 2. (Route 12,13, 50)
 Howrah Station – 1908 to 1994 = 86 years, now bus terminus. (Route 11,12A, 12B, 18,20,21,26,28,30,32,40,41,42)
 Bandhaghat – 1908 to 1971 = 63 years, now a street. (Route 41,42)
 Shibpur – 1908 to 1971 = 63 years, now a street. (Route 40)
 Behala - 1908 to 2011 = 103 years, now a street. (Route 27,35)
 Racecourse - 1927 to 1976 = 49 years, now a street. (no specified route, only race specials)
 Ballygunge - 1928 to still running, tram terminus. (Route 24,25,26,27)
 Planetarium - 1979 to 1992 = 13 years, now a park. (Route 12A)
 Ultadanga - 1985 to 2020 = 35 years, now lying abandoned. (Route 16,17,18)
 Joka - 1986 to 2011 = 25 years (Route 37), now bus terminus.

Routes

Active

Inactive

Former

Accidents 

 On 3 December 2012, a seven-year-old was killed by a tram entering the Ultadanga depot. The boy was reportedly playing near the tracks when the tram approached and it struck him, before the brakes could be fully applied.
 A bus driver attempted to overtake a tram on 31 January 2013. The rear of the bus grazed the tram, amputating a bus passenger's arm. The man was rushed to the hospital for his arm to be reattached.
 On 19 June 2014, a driverless tram struck 10 cars. No fatalities or injuries were reported.

Present Day Advocacy and Awareness 
Calcutta Tram Users Association (CTUA) is an apolitical organization created in December 2016 and registered under the Society Act, formed by the common people of West Bengal united by their love for the tramways. Advocating for the Tramways of Kolkata since 2016!

In popular culture 
A few movies were shot in tram and its depots:

 Howrah Bridge
Bari theke Paliye
Mahanagar
Interview
Baharen Phir Bhi Aayengi
City of Joy
Char Adhyay
Calcutta Mail
Yuva
Parineeta
Sukno Lanka
Kahaani
Barfi
Open tee Bioscope
Piku
Bullet Raja
Jay Jay
Parineeta
Detective Byomkesh Bakshy
Meri pyaari Bindu
Raavan

See also 

 Trams in India
 Kolkata Metro
 Kolkata Suburban Railway
 Kolkata Circular Railway
 List of tram and light rail transit systems

References

Notes 
 Niyogi, S. Shake, rattle & roll. The Sunday Story, Sunday Times of India, Kolkata, 25 June 2006. Available on Times of India e-paper (paid subscription required as of 2010).
 Calcutta Tram Users Association (CTUA)
 Pathak Pratap Shankar, The Sunday Story, Sunday Times of India, Kolkata
Tramjatra
Tramjatra: imagining Melbourne and Kolkata by tramways Mick Douglas
 Pramanick, S., Anwaruzzaman, A. K., & Roy, U. (2019). A Profile of Tramways in Kolkata - A Sustainable Urban Public Transport. (A. Sarkar, Ed.) Indian Journal of Spatial Science, 10 (2), 59–64. (https://www.researchgate.net/publication/336085491_A_Profile_of_Tramways_in_Kolkata_ _A_Sustainable_Urban_Public_Transport)

External links 

 Official website of Calcutta Tramways Company
 The Calcutta Tram Users Association (CTUA)
 Urbanrail.net page with schematic map of trams in Kolkata
 Melbourne - Calcutta Tramjatra Festival
 Geographical map of trams in Kolkata, both past and latest updates
 Some great photos of trams in Kolkata
 Department of Transport from the Government of West Bengal website
 A little more Information about trams in Kolkata

 
550 V DC railway electrification
Kolkata
Kolkata
Kolkata
Transport in Kolkata
Rail transport in Kolkata